The 1984 All-Ireland Junior Hurling Championship was the 63rd staging of the All-Ireland Junior Championship since its establishment by the Gaelic Athletic Association in 1912.

Cork entered the championship as the defending champions, however, they were beaten by Kilkenny in the All-Ireland semi-final.

The All-Ireland final was played on 5 August 1984 at Semple Stadium in Thurles, between Kilkenny and Galway, in what was their first ever meeting in a final. Kilkenny won the match by 0-13 to 2-05 to claim their fifth championship title overall and a first title since 1956.

Results

All-Ireland Junior Hurling Championship

All-Ireland semi-finals

All-Ireland final

References

Junior
All-Ireland Junior Hurling Championship